The brown-flanked bush warbler (Horornis fortipes), also known as the brownish-flanked bush warbler, is a species of bush-warbler of the family Cettiidae. It was formerly included in the "Old World warbler" assemblage.  It is found in South Asia.

References

brown-flanked bush warbler
Birds of Bhutan
Birds of China
Birds of Myanmar
Birds of Nepal
Birds of Northeast India
Birds of Taiwan
Birds of Yunnan
brown-flanked bush warbler